The Two Orphans (French:Les Deux orphelines) is a 1965 historical drama film directed by Riccardo Freda and starring Sophie Darès, Valeria Ciangottini, Mike Marshall. It is based on the novel Les deux ophelines by Adolphe d'Ennery.

Cast
 Sophie Darès - Henriette Gérard
 Valeria Ciangottini - Louise
 Mike Marshall - Roger de Vaudray
 Jacques Castelot - Le marquis de Presle
 Jean Desailly - Le comte de Linières
 Alice Sapritch - La Frochard
 Simone Valère - La comtesse de Linières
 Jean Carmet - Picard
 Roger Fradet - LaFleur
 Michel Barbey - Jacques Frochard
 Marie-France Mignal - Marianne
 Gabrielle Doulcet - Marion
 Denis Manuel - Pierre Frochard
 André Falcon - Docteur Hébert

Release
The Two Orphans was released in France on May 25, 1965 where it was distributed by CFF.

See also
 Orphans of the Storm (1921)
 The Two Orphans (1933)
 The Two Orphans (1942)
 The Two Orphans (1954)
 The Two Orphans (1976)

References

Footnotes

Sources

External links
 

1965 films
1960s historical films
French historical films
Italian historical films
1960s Italian-language films
Films based on French novels
French Revolution films
Films about capital punishment
Films about orphans
Films set in Paris
1960s Italian films
1960s French films